John Andrew Hunter (born 8 November 1943) is a former New Zealand rower who won a gold Olympic medal in his career.

Hunter was born in 1943 in Christchurch, New Zealand. At the 1972 Summer Olympics in Munich he teamed with Dick Joyce, Wybo Veldman, Tony Hurt, Lindsay Wilson, Joe Earl, Trevor Coker and Gary Robertson and Simon Dickie (cox) to win the gold medal in the eights. Hunter had previously been a member of the eight which finished fourth at the 1968 Summer Olympics in Mexico City. He was also the Rowing Manager for the New Zealand team at the 1996 Summer Olympics in Atlanta.

Hunter was later an engineering consultant in Christchurch. He was employed by the New Zealand Ministry of Works and was involved in the expansion of Christchurch International Airport. As a rowing coach, he managed many teams including some of the teams at the 1996 Summer Olympics in Atlanta.

References

External links
 
 

1943 births
Living people
New Zealand male rowers
Olympic gold medalists for New Zealand in rowing
Rowers at the 1968 Summer Olympics
Rowers at the 1972 Summer Olympics
World Rowing Championships medalists for New Zealand
Medalists at the 1972 Summer Olympics
Rowers from Christchurch
European Rowing Championships medalists
20th-century New Zealand people